Luke Sauder (born 13 September 1970) is a Canadian former alpine skier who competed in the 1994 Winter Olympics and 1998 Winter Olympics. He was inducted into the Cambridge (ON) Sports Hall of Fame in 2007.

References

External links
 sports-reference.com

1970 births
Living people
Olympic alpine skiers of Canada
Alpine skiers at the 1994 Winter Olympics
Alpine skiers at the 1998 Winter Olympics
Canadian male alpine skiers